Otto is a German, Dutch, Hungarian, Danish, and Swedish surname. Notable people with the surname include:

 Adolph Wilhelm Otto (1786–1845), German anatomist
 Catherine Otto, author of echocardiography textbooks
 Christoph Friedrich Otto (1783–1856), German botanist 
 Felix Otto (mathematician) (born 1966), German mathematician
 Frei Otto (1925–2015), German architect
 Frank Otto (academic) (born 1936), American educator and entrepreneur
 Gertrud Otto (1895–1970) German art historian
 Gustav Otto (1883–1926), German aircraft and aircraft-engine designer and manufacturer
 Jan Otto (1841–1916), publisher of Otto's encyclopedia
 John Otto (disambiguation), several people
 Justine Otto (born 1974), German artist
 Lisa Otto (1919–2013), German opera singer
 Mary Otto, American journalist
 Michael Otto (businessman) (born 1943), German businessman
 Nicolaus Otto (1832–1891), coinventor of the Otto cycle
 Rudolf Otto (1869–1937), German theologian
 Shawn Lawrence Otto, American author, filmmaker, political strategist
 Venantia Otto (born 1987), Namibian fashion model
 William Tod Otto (1816–1905), American judge
 Walter Friedrich Otto (1874–1958), German philologist

Arts
 Arthur H. Otto (born 1876), organist in South Australia. Later singing career in England as Arthur Kingston-Stewart.
 Barry Otto (born 1941), Australian actor
 John Otto (drummer) (born 1977), Canadian-born American drummer
 Ludwig Otto (1850—1920), a German landscape painter, etcher, and lithographer
 Miranda Otto (born 1967), Australian actress, daughter of Barry
 Natalino Otto (1912–1969), Italian singer
 Ralf Otto (born 1956), German choral conductor and academic teacher
 Waldemar Otto (1929–2020), Polish born German sculptor
 Wilhelm Lanzky-Otto (1909–1991), Danish-born horn player
 Whitney Otto, American author of How to Make an American Quilt
 Otto (composer) (first name unknown, fl. 18th century), composer of the early classical period

Sports
 Anita Otto (born 1942), German discus thrower
 Glenn Otto (born 1996), American baseball player
 Hennie Otto (born 1976), South African professional golfer
 Jim Otto (born 1939), American footballer
 Joel Otto (born 1961), ice hockey player
 Jonathan Castro Otto (born 1994), Spanish football player
 Kristin Otto (born 1968), German swimmer
 Krynauw Otto (born 1971), South African rugby player
 Ricky Otto (born 1967), English footballer
 Sylke Otto (born 1969), German luger
 Werner Otto (cyclist) (born 1948), East German track cyclist

See also
 Otto, given name
 Otto (disambiguation), other uses

German-language surnames
Patronymic surnames
Surnames from given names